Havre station is a train station, re-fueling, and service stop for the Amtrak Empire Builder in Havre, Montana.  The station, platform, and parking are owned by BNSF Railway, and the station was previously owned and operated by the Great Northern Railway

On static display, next to the station, is Great Northern Railway steam locomotive #2584, a 4-8-4 "Northern" type S-2 Class, which served the station while it was in passenger service. It has been on display there since May 15, 1964. Nearby is a sculpture representing "U.S. – Canada Friendship" and a statue of James J. Hill, the man for whom the Empire Builder is named and the developer of the Great Northern Railway.

References

External links 

Havre station – USA Rail Guide (Train Web)

Amtrak stations in Montana
Former Great Northern Railway (U.S.) stations
Railway stations in the United States opened in 1893
Buildings and structures in Hill County, Montana
1893 establishments in Montana